The Chang FA Cup 2015 is the 22nd season of Thailand knockout football competition. The tournament is organized by the Football Association of Thailand.

The cup winner is guaranteed a place in the  2016 AFC Champions League Play-off.

Calendar

Results

Qualification round 
Qualification round for teams currently playing in the 2015 Thai Division 1 League, Regional League Division 2 and Other CUP level. Qualification round was held 4 March 2015.

First round 
First round for teams currently playing in the 2015 Thai Division 1 League, Regional League Division 2 and Other CUP level. The First round was held 24 June 2015.

Second round

Third Round

Quarter-finals

Semi-finals

Final

Notes

See also
 2015 Thai Premier League
 2015 Thai Division 1 League
 2015 Regional League Division 2
 2015 Thai League Cup
 2015 Kor Royal Cup

References
 https://web.archive.org/web/20150227193403/http://www.siamsport.co.th/Sport_Football/150223_382.html
 https://web.archive.org/web/20150422020710/http://www.siamsport.co.th/Sport_Football/150409_185.html
 https://web.archive.org/web/20150711222414/http://www.siamsport.co.th/Sport_Football/150707_149.html
 https://web.archive.org/web/20150909231543/http://www.siamsport.co.th/Sport_Football/150907_202.html
 https://web.archive.org/web/20151030011154/http://siamsport.co.th/Sport_Football/151026_238.html

External links
 Official

Thai FA Cup seasons
2015 in Thai football cups